Miss Colorado USA is the beauty pageant that selects the representative for the state of Colorado in the Miss USA pageant, and the name of the title held by its winner. The pageant is directed by Future Productions.

Colorado's most successful placements were in 1963 and 2010, when Rhea Looney and Jessica Hartman, respectively, placed as the third runner-up. Colorado's most recent placement was in 2012, when Marybel Gonzalez placed in the Top 10.

Alexis Glover of Colorado Springs was crowned Miss Colorado USA on July 3, 2022 at Union Colony Civic Center in Greeley. She represented Colorado at Miss USA 2022.

Gallery of titleholders

Results summary

Placements
3rd Runner-Up: Rhea Looney (1963), Jessica Hartman (2010)
Top 10: Debbie James (1989), Tiani Jones (2000), Marybel Gonzalez (2012)
Top 15/16/20: Jeanie Carroll (1953), Dorothy Jane Bewley (1955), Karen Keeler (1956), Diane Lee Gardner (1959), Penny Jo James (1962), Susan Hawkins (1969)

Colorado holds a record of 11 placements at Miss USA.

Awards
Miss Congeniality: Diane Knaub (1971), Crystal Grove (1998)
Miss Photogenic: Katee Doland (2001), Susan Hawkins (1969)

Winners 

Color key

Notes

References

External links
 (archived; to 2006)
 (archived; from 2007 to 2010)
 (current)

Colorado
Colorado culture
Women in Colorado
1952 establishments in Colorado
Recurring events established in 1952
Annual events in Colorado